The Independent Division was an infantry division of the Greek Army during the Greco-Turkish War of 1919–1922. Originally formed in July 1921 in Eastern Thrace under Major General Georgios Leonardopoulos to take part in the envisaged, but never realized, occupation of Constantinople, it was transferred to the front in Asia Minor in August. The division captured the town of Seyitgazi in September, and remained there in defensive positions until the Turkish offensive in August 1922. The collapse of the Army of Asia Minor's front and the subsequent Turkish advance left the division, now commanded by Colonel Dimitrios Theotokis, effectively cut off behind enemy lines. Nevertheless, the division managed to cross Asia Minor in order and intact, giving battle with the Turkish forces and taking under its protection some 8,000 Greek and Armenian civilians in the process. The division was then shipped back to Thrace, where it was amalgamated with the remnants of the 12th Infantry Division into a new 12th Division, as part of the Army of the Evros.

Sources
 
 
 

1921 establishments in Greece
1922 establishments in Greece
Infantry divisions of Greece
Military units and formations established in 1921
Military units and formations disestablished in 1922
Military units and formations of Greece in the Greco-Turkish War (1919–1922)